Kew Gardens is a botanic garden in southwest London that houses the "largest and most diverse botanical and mycological collections in the world". Founded in 1840, from the exotic garden at Kew Park, its living collections include some of the 27,000 taxa curated by Royal Botanic Gardens, Kew, while the herbarium, one of the largest in the world, has over  preserved plant and fungal specimens. The library contains more than 750,000 volumes, and the illustrations collection contains more than 175,000 prints and drawings of plants. It is one of London's top tourist attractions and is a World Heritage Site.

Kew Gardens, together with the botanic gardens at Wakehurst in Sussex, are managed by the Royal Botanic Gardens, Kew, an internationally important botanical research and education institution that employs over 1,100 staff and is a non-departmental public body sponsored by the Department for Environment, Food and Rural Affairs.

It is listed Grade I on the Register of Historic Parks and Gardens.

Kew Gardens has its own police force, Kew Constabulary, which has been in operation since 1845.

History

Kew consists mostly of the gardens themselves and a small surrounding community. Royal residences in the area which would later influence the layout and construction of the gardens began in 1299 when Edward I moved his court to a manor house in neighbouring Richmond (then called Sheen). That manor house was later abandoned; however, Henry VII built Sheen Palace in 1501, which, under the name Richmond Palace, became a permanent royal residence for Henry VII. Around the start of the 16th century courtiers attending Richmond Palace settled in Kew and built large houses. Early royal residences at Kew included Mary Tudor's house, which was in existence by 1522 when a driveway was built to connect it to the palace at Richmond. Around 1600, the land that would become the gardens was known as Kew Field, a large field strip farmed by one of the new private estates.

The exotic garden at Kew Park, formed by Henry Capell, 1st Baron Capell of Tewkesbury, was enlarged and extended by Augusta, Dowager Princess of Wales, the widow of Frederick, Prince of Wales. The origins of Kew Gardens can be traced to the merging of the royal estates of Richmond and Kew in 1772. William Chambers built several garden structures, including the lofty Great Pagoda built in 1761 which still remains. George III enriched the gardens, aided by William Aiton and Sir Joseph Banks. The old Kew Park (by then renamed the White House), was demolished in 1802. The "Dutch House" adjoining was purchased by George III in 1781 as a nursery for the royal children. It is a plain brick structure now known as Kew Palace.

The Epicure's Almanack reports an anecdote of the garden wall as of 1815: "In going up Dreary Lane that leads to Richmond you pass along the east boundary wall of Kew Gardens, extending more than a mile in length. This dead wall used to have a most teasing and tedious effect on the eye of a pedestrian; but a poor mendicant crippled seaman, some years ago, enlivened it by drawing on it, in chalk, every man of war in the British navy. He returns annually to the spot to refit his ships, and raises considerable supplies for his own victualling board from the gratuities of the charitable, who pass to and from Richmond."

Some early plants came from the walled garden established by William Coys at Stubbers in North Ockendon. The collections grew somewhat haphazardly until the appointment of the first collector, Francis Masson, in 1771. Capability Brown, who became England's most renowned landscape architect, applied for the position of master gardener at Kew, and was rejected.

In 1840, the gardens were adopted as a national botanical garden, in large part due to the efforts of the Royal Horticultural Society and its president William Cavendish. The first curator was John Smith.

The Palm House was built by architect Decimus Burton and iron-maker Richard Turner between 1844 and 1848, and was the first large-scale structural use of wrought iron. It is considered "the world's most important surviving Victorian glass and iron structure". The structure's panes of glass are all hand-blown. The Temperate House, which is twice as large as the Palm House, followed later in the 19th century. It is now the largest Victorian glasshouse in existence. Kew was the location of the successful effort in the 19th century to propagate rubber trees for cultivation outside South America.

In February 1913, the Tea House was burned down by suffragettes Olive Wharry and Lilian Lenton during a series of arson attacks in London.

Kew Gardens lost hundreds of trees in the Great Storm of 1987.

From 1959 to 2007, Kew Gardens had the tallest flagpole in Britain. Made from a single Douglas-fir from Canada, it was given to mark both the centenary of the Canadian Province of British Columbia and the bicentenary of Kew Gardens. The flagpole was removed after damage by weather and woodpeckers made it a danger.

In July 2003, UNESCO put the gardens on its list of World Heritage Sites. by UNESCO.

A five-year, £41 million revamp of the Temperate House was completed in May 2018.

Five trees survive from the establishment of the botanical gardens in 1762. Together they are known as the 'Five Lions' and consist of: a ginkgo (Ginkgo biloba), a pagoda tree, or scholar tree (Styphnolobium japonicum), an oriental plane (Platanus orientalis), a black locust, or false acacia (Robinia pseudoacacia), and a Caucasian elm or zelkova (Zelkova carpinifolia).

Features

Treetop walkway
Visitors can ascend and descend by stairs and by a lift. The walkway floor is perforated metal and flexes under foot; the entire structure sways in the wind. It was designed by David Marks.

The accompanying photograph shows a section of the walkway, including the steel supports, which were designed to rust to a tree-like appearance to help the walkway fit in visually with its surroundings.

A short video detailing the construction of the walkway is available online.

Lake Crossing

The Lake Crossing bridge, made of granite and bronze, opened in May 2006. Designed by Buro Happold and John Pawson, it crosses the lake and was previously named in honor of Dr Mortimer and Theresa Sackler.

The minimalist-styled bridge is designed as a sweeping double curve of black granite. The sides of the bridge are formed of bronze posts that give the impression, from certain angles, of forming a solid wall while, from others, and to those on the bridge, they are clearly individual entities that allow a view of the water beyond.

The bridge forms part of a path designed to encourage visitors to visit more of the gardens than had hitherto been popular and connects the two art galleries, via the Temperate and Evolution Houses and the woodland glade, to the Minka House and the Bamboo Garden.

The crossing won a special award from the Royal Institute of British Architects in 2008.

The Hive
The Hive opened in 2016 and is a multi-sensory experience designed to highlight the extraordinary life of bees. It stands 17 metres (56 ft) tall and is set in a wildflower meadow. The Hive was designed by English artist Wolfgang Buttress. The Hive has been created using thousands of aluminium pieces that are presented in the shape of a honeycomb. It was initially installed as a temporary exhibition, but was given a permanent home at Kew Gardens due to its popularity.

Vehicular tour
Kew Explorer is a service that takes a circular route around the gardens, provided by two 72-seater road trains that are fuelled by Calor Gas to minimize pollution. A commentary is provided by the driver and there are several stops.

A map of the gardens is available on the Kew Gardens website.

Compost heap
Kew has one of the largest compost heaps in Europe, made from green and woody waste from the gardens and the manure from the stables of the Household Cavalry. The compost is mainly used in the gardens, but on occasion has been auctioned as part of a fundraising event for the gardens.

The compost heap is in an area of the gardens not accessible to the public, but a viewing platform, made of wood which had been illegally traded but seized by Customs officers in HMRC, has been erected to allow visitors to observe the heap as it goes through its cycle.

Guided walks
Tours of the gardens are conducted daily by trained volunteers.

Plant houses

Alpine House

In March 2006, the Davies Alpine House opened, the third version of an alpine house since 1887.

The new house features a set of automatically operated blinds that prevent it from overheating when the sun is too hot for the plants together with a system that blows a continuous stream of cool air over the plants. The main design aim of the house is to allow maximum light transmission. To this end the glass is of a special low iron type that allows 90 percent of the ultraviolet light in sunlight to pass. It is attached by high tension steel cables so that no light is obstructed by traditional glazing bars.

To conserve energy the cooling air is not refrigerated but is cooled by being passed through a labyrinth of pipes buried under the house at a depth where the temperature remains suitable all year round. The house is designed so that the maximum temperature should not exceed .

Kew's collection of Alpine plants (defined as those that grow above the tree line in their locale – ground level at the poles rising to over ), extends to over 7000. As the Alpine House can only house around 200 at a time the ones on show are regularly rotated.

Nash Conservatory

Originally designed for Buckingham Palace, this was moved to Kew in 1836 by King William IV. The building was formerly known as the Aroid House No. 1 and was used to display species of Araceae, the building was listed Grade II* in 1950. With an abundance of natural light, the building is now used for various exhibitions, weddings, and private events. It is also now used to exhibit the winners of the photography competition.

Orangery

The Orangery was designed by Sir William Chambers, and was completed in 1761. It measures . It was found to be too dark for its intended purpose of growing citrus plants and they were moved out in 1841. After many changes of use, it is currently used as a restaurant.

Palm House

The Palm House (1844–1848) was the result of cooperation between architect Decimus Burton and iron founder Richard Turner, and continues upon the glass house design principles developed by John Claudius Loudon and Joseph Paxton. A space frame of wrought iron arches, held together by horizontal tubular structures containing long prestressed cables, supports glass panes which were originally tinted green with copper oxide to reduce the significant heating effect. In front of the Palm House on the east side are the Queen's Beasts, ten statues of animals bearing shields. They are Portland stone replicas of originals done by James Woodford and were placed here in 1958.

The Palm House was originally heated by two coal-fired boilers, with a  chimney, the "Shaft of the Great Palm-Stove", now known as the Campanile, near the Victoria Gate. Coal was brought in by a light railway, running in a tunnel, using human-propelled wagons.> The tunnel acted as a flue between the boilers and the chimney, but the distance proved too great for efficient working, and so two small chimneys were added to the Palm House. In 1950 the railway was electrified. The tunnel is now used to carry piped hot water to the Palm House, from oil-fired boilers located near the original chimney, which is extant, and is Grade II listed.

Princess of Wales Conservatory

Kew's third major conservatory, the Princess of Wales Conservatory, designed by architect Gordon Wilson, was opened in 1987 by Diana, Princess of Wales in commemoration of her predecessor Augusta's associations with Kew. It replaced 26 smaller buildings. In 1989 the conservatory received the Europa Nostra award for conservation. The conservatory houses ten computer-controlled micro-climatic zones, with the bulk of the greenhouse volume composed of Dry Tropics and Wet Tropics plants. Significant numbers of orchids, water lilies, cacti, lithops, carnivorous plants and bromeliads are housed in the various zones. The cactus collection also extends outside the conservatory where some hardier species can be found.

As it is designed to minimize the amount of energy taken to run it, the cooler zones are grouped around the outside and the more tropical zones are in the central area where heat is conserved. The glass roof extends down to the ground, giving the conservatory a distinctive appearance and helping to maximize the use of the sun's energy.

During the construction of the conservatory a time capsule was buried. It contains the seeds of basic crops and endangered plant species and key publications on conservation.

The Temperate House 

The Temperate House, re-opened in May 2018 after being closed for restoration, is a greenhouse that has twice the floor area of the Palm House and is the world's largest surviving Victorian glass structure. It contains plants and trees from all the temperate regions of the world, some of which are extremely rare. It was commissioned in 1859 and designed by architect Decimus Burton and iron founder Richard Turner. Intended to accommodate Kew's expanding collection of hardy and temperate plants, it took 40 years to construct, during which time costs soared. The building was closed for restoration 1980–82. The building was restored during 2014–15 by Donald Insall Associates, based on their conservation management plan.

There is a viewing gallery in the central section from which visitors can look down on that part of the collection.

Waterlily House

The Waterlily House is the hottest and most humid of the houses at Kew and contains a large pond with varieties of water lily, surrounded by a display of economically important heat-loving plants. It closes during the winter months.

It was built to house Victoria amazonica, the largest of the water lily family Nymphaeaceae. This plant was originally transported to Kew in vials of clean water and arrived in February 1849, after several prior attempts to transport seeds and roots had failed. Although various other members of Nymphaeaceae grew well, the house did not suit the Victoria, purportedly because of a poor ventilation system, and this specimen was moved to another, smaller, house (Victoria amazonica House No. 10).

The ironwork for the Waterlily House project was provided by Richard Turner and the initial construction was completed in 1852. The heat for the house was initially obtained by running a flue from the nearby Palm House but it was later equipped with its own boiler.

Evolution House 
Formerly known as the Australian House. The house was a gift from the Australian Government. It was designed by S L Rothwell (Ministry of Works) with consultant engineer J E Temple and was constructed by the Crittall Manufacturing Company Ltd. It opened in 1952. From 1995 it was known as the Evolution House. The building is listed under the Planning (Listed Buildings and Conservation Areas) Act 1990 for its special architectural or historic interest.

Bonsai House 
The Bonsai House was formerly known as the Alpine House No. 24 prior to the construction of the Davies Alpine House.

Former plant houses 
The following plant houses were in use in 1974. All have since been demolished.

The extant Aroid House (now the Nash Conservatory) was designated Plant House No. 1 and the Water Lily House was Plant House No. 15.

Ornamental buildings

Great Pagoda

In the southeast corner of Kew Gardens stands the Great Pagoda (by Sir William Chambers), erected in 1762, from a design in imitation of the Chinese Ta.

Each storey finishes with a projecting roof, after the Chinese manner, originally covered with ceramic tiles and adorned with large dragons; a tale is still propagated that they were made of gold and were reputedly sold by George IV to settle his debts. In fact the dragons were made of wood painted gold, and simply rotted away with the ravages of time. The walls of the building are composed of brick. The staircase, 253 steps, is in the center of the building. During the Second World War holes were cut in each floor to allow for drop-testing of model bombs.

The Pagoda was closed to the public for many years but was reopened for the summer months of 2006. It has been renovated in a major restoration project and reopened under the aegis of Historic Royal Palaces in 2018. 80 dragons have been remade and now sit on each storey of the building.

Japanese Gateway (Chokushi-Mon)

Built for the Japan-British Exhibition (1910) and moved to Kew in 1911, the Chokushi-Mon ("Imperial Envoy's Gateway") is a four-fifths scale replica of the karamon (gateway) of the Nishi Hongan-ji temple in Kyoto.

Minka House

Following the Japan 2001 festival, Kew acquired a Japanese wooden house called a minka. It was originally erected in around 1900 in a suburb of Okazaki and is now located within the bamboo collection in the west-central part of Kew Gardens. Japanese craftsmen reassembled the framework and British builders who had worked on the Globe Theatre added the mud wall panels.

Work on the building of the house was completed in November 2001 but the internal artifacts were not all in place until 2006.

Queen Charlotte's Cottage

Within the conservation area is a cottage that was built sometime before 1771 for Queen Charlotte by her husband George III. It has been restored by Historic Royal Palaces and is separately administered by them. It is open to the public on weekends and bank holidays during the summer.

King William's Temple 
A double porticoed Doric temple in stone with a series of cast-iron panels set in the inside walls commemorating British military victories from Minden (1759) to Waterloo (1815). It was built in 1837 by Sir Jeffery Wyatville, and originally called The Pantheon. Named after King William IV (1830–37). It is Grade II listed.

Temple of Aeolus 
A domed rotunda with eight Tuscan columns. The original temple was built in 1763 by Sir William Chambers. The present temple is an 1845 replacement by Decimus Burton. It is Grade II listed. The temple was one of three originally named to honour British victories in the Seven Years' War, in this case the name commemorates HMS Aeolus.

Temple of Arethusa 
A small Greek temple portico with two Ionic columns and two outer Ionic pillars; it is pedimented with a cornice and key pattern frieze. It was built in 1758 by Sir William Chambers. It is Grade II listed. Similar to the temple of Aeolus and Bellona, she was later named to commemorate the warship HMS Arethusa.

Temple of Bellona 
A whitewashed stucco temple. The facade has a portico of two pairs of Doric columns with a metope frieze pediment and an oval dome behind. Inside is a room with an oval domed center. On the walls garlands and medallions with the names and numbers of British and Hanovarian units connected with the Seven Years' War. It was built in 1760 by Sir William Chambers and eventually named after HMS Bellona. It is Grade II listed.

The Ruined Arch 
A brick arch with rustication in stucco. A triple-arched opening with oculi above lower side arches, it has a stone band course and a fragmented blocked cornice and brick offering, and a corniced doorway. It was built in 1759–60 by Sir William Chambers. It is Grade II* listed.

Ice House 
The Ice House is believed to be early 18th-century, it has a brick dome with an access arch and barrel-vaulted passageway, covered by a mound of earth. It is Grade II listed.

Kew Palace

Kew Palace is the smallest of the British royal palaces. It was built by Samuel Fortrey, a Dutch merchant in around 1631. It was later purchased by George III. The construction method is known as Flemish bond and involves laying the bricks with long and short sides alternating. This and the gabled front give the construction a Dutch appearance.

To the rear of the building is the "Queen's Garden" which includes a collection of plants believed to have medicinal qualities. Only plants that were extant in England by the 17th century are grown in the garden.

The building underwent significant restoration, with leading conservation architects Donald Insall Associates, before being reopened to the public in 2006. It is administered separately from Kew Gardens, by Historic Royal Palaces.

In front of the palace is a sundial, which was given to Kew Gardens in 1959 to commemorate a royal visit. It was sculpted by Martin Holden and is a replica of one by Thomas Tompion, a celebrated 17th-century clockmaker, which had been sited near the surviving palace building since 1832 to mark the site of James Bradley's observations leading to his discovery of the aberration of light.

Galleries and museums
Admission to the galleries and museum is free after paying admission to the gardens. The International Garden Photographer of the Year Exhibition is an annual event with an indoor display of entries during the summer months.

Shirley Sherwood Gallery

The Shirley Sherwood Gallery of Botanic Art opened in April 2008, and holds paintings from Kew's and Dr Shirley Sherwood's collections, many of which had never been displayed to the public before. It features paintings by artists such as Georg D. Ehret, the Bauer brothers, Pierre-Joseph Redouté and Walter Hood Fitch. The paintings and drawings are cycled on a six-monthly basis. The gallery is linked to the Marianne North Gallery (see below).

Museum No. 1
Near the Palm House is a building known as the General Museum or "Museum No. 1" (even though it is now the only museum on the site), which was designed by Decimus Burton and opened in 1857. Housing Kew's economic botany collections including tools, ornaments, clothing, food and medicines, its aim was to illustrate human dependence on plants. The building was refurbished in 1998. The upper two floors are now an education center and the ground floor houses The Botanical restaurant. Due to its historical holdings, Kew is a member of The London Museums of Health & Medicine group.

Marianne North Gallery

The Marianne North Gallery was built in the 1880s to house the paintings of Marianne North, an MP's daughter who travelled alone to North and South America, South Africa, and many parts of Asia, at a time when women rarely did so, to paint plants. The gallery has 832 of her paintings. She left the paintings to Kew on condition that the layout of the paintings in the gallery would not be altered.

The gallery had suffered considerable structural degradation since its creation and during a period from 2008 to 2009 major restoration and refurbishment took place, with works led by leading conservation architects Donald Insall Associates. During the time the gallery was closed the opportunity was also taken to restore the paintings to their original condition. The gallery reopened in October 2009.

The gallery originally opened in 1882 and is still the only permanent exhibition in Great Britain dedicated to the work of one woman.

Former museum buildings 
The School of Horticulture building was formerly known as the Reference Museum or Museum No. 2.

Museum No. 3 was originally known as the Timber Museum, it opened in 1863 and closed in 1958.

Cambridge Cottage is a former residence of the Duke of Cambridge (1819–1904). It became part of the gardens in 1904, and was opened in 1910 as the Museum of British Forestry or Museum No. 4. After 1958 it was known as the Wood Museum and displayed samples of wood from around the world. It is Grade II listed. Today it is a meeting and function venue.

Science

Plant collections

The living plant collections include the Alpine and Rock Garden, Aquatic, Arboretum, Arid, Aroid, Bonsai, Bromeliad, Carnivorous Plant, Cycad, Fern, Grass, Island Flora, Mediterranean Garden, Orchid, Palm, Temperate Herbaceous, Tender Temperate, Tropical Herbaceous, and Tropical Woody and Climbers Collections.

The Aquatic Garden is near the Jodrell laboratory. The Aquatic Garden, which celebrated its centenary in 2009, provides conditions for aquatic and marginal plants. The large central pool holds a selection of summer-flowering water lilies and the corner pools contain plants such as reed mace, bulrushes, Phragmites and smaller floating aquatic species.

The Bonsai Collection is housed in a dedicated greenhouse near the Jodrell laboratory.

The Arid Collection (including Cactaceae and many other succulent plants) is housed in the Tropical Nursery, the Princess of Wales Conservatory and the Temperate House.

The Carnivorous Plant collection is housed in the Princess of Wales Conservatory.

The Grass Garden was created on its current site in the early 1980s to display ornamental and economic grasses; it was redesigned and replanted between 1994 and 1997. Over 580 species of grasses are displayed.

The Orchid Collection is housed in two climate zones within the Princess of Wales Conservatory. To maintain an interesting display the plants are changed regularly so that those on view are generally flowering. The Rock Garden, originally built of limestone in 1882, is now constructed of Sussex sandstone from West Hoathly, Sussex. The rock garden is divided into six geographic regions: Europe, Mediterranean and Africa, Australia and New Zealand, Asia, North America, and South America. There are currently 2,480 different "accessions" growing in the garden.

The Arboretum, which covers the southern two-thirds of the site, contains over 14,000 trees of many thousands of varieties.

Herbarium 

The Kew Herbarium is one of the largest in the world with approximately  specimens used primarily for taxonomic study. The herbarium is rich in types for all regions of the world, especially the tropics, and is currently growing with 30,000 new specimen additions annually through international collaborations. The Kew Herbarium is of global importance, attracting researchers from and supporting and engaging in the science of botany all over the world, especially the field of biodiversity. A large part of the herbarium has been digitised, and is available to the general public on-line. The Index Herbariorum code assigned to the Kew herbarium is K and it is used when citing housed specimens.

Kew Gardens holds further collections of scientific importance including a Fungarium (for fungi), a plant DNA bank and a seed bank. The Kew Fungarium houses approximately 1.25 million specimens of dried fungi.

Library and archives 

The Library, Art & Archives at Kew are one of the world's largest botanical collections, with over half a million items, including books, botanical illustrations, photographs, letters and manuscripts, periodicals, and maps. The Archives, Illustrations, Rare Book collections, Main Library, and Economic Botany Library are housed within the Herbarium building.

Owing to an agreement signed in 1962, the scope of the collection generally does not overlap that of the Natural History Museum in London, which concerns itself with the flora of Europe and North America.

Forensic horticulture 

Kew provides advice and guidance to police forces around the world where plant material may provide important clues or evidence in cases. In one famous case, the forensic science department at Kew was able to ascertain that the contents of the stomach of a headless corpse found in the river Thames contained a highly toxic African bean.

Economic Botany 

The Sustainable Uses of Plants Group (formerly the Centre for Economic Botany), focuses on the uses of plants in the United Kingdom and the world's arid and semi-arid zones. The center is also responsible for the curation of the Economic Botany Collection, which contains more than 90,000 botanical raw materials and ethnographic artifacts, some of which are on display in the Plants + People exhibit in Museum No. 1. The centre is now located in the Jodrell Laboratory.

Jodrell Laboratory 

The original Jodrell laboratory, named after Mr. T. J. Phillips Jodrell who funded it, was established in 1876 and consisted of four research rooms and an office. Originally research was conducted into plant physiology but this was gradually superseded by botanical research. In 1934 an artists' studio and photographic darkroom were added, highlighting the importance of botanical illustration. In 1965, following increasing overcrowding, a new building was constructed, and research expanded into seed collection for plant conservation. The biochemistry section also expanded to facilitate research into secondary compounds that could be derived from plants for medicinal purposes. In 1994 the center was expanded again, tripling in size, and a decade later it was further expanded by the addition of the Wolfson Wing.

Achievements 

The world's smallest water-lily, Nymphaea thermarum, was saved from extinction when it was grown from seed at Kew, in 2009.

In 2022, Kew Gardens scientists identified a new species of Victoria waterlily, Victoria boliviana, that had been growing at the Gardens for over 170 years.

Other features

Kew Constabulary 

The gardens have their own police force, Kew Constabulary, attested under section 3 of the Parks Regulation Act 1872. Formerly known as the Royal Botanic Gardens Constabulary, it is a small, specialised constabulary of two sergeants and 12 officers, who patrol the grounds in a marked silver car. The Parks Regulation Act gives them the same powers as the Metropolitan Police within the land belonging to the gardens.

War memorials 

The memorial to the several Kew gardeners killed in the First World War lies in the nearby St Luke's Church in Kew. It was designed by Sir Robert Lorimer in 1921.

There are two memorial benches in the gardens. The Remembrance and Hope seat and the Verdun Bench, both containing parts of a felled oak tree whose acorn came from the battlefield of Verdun. The oak was grown at Kew until a storm in 2013 damaged the tree and so required removal.

Food and Drink 
Kew is home to a number of eateries including The Orangery, Pavilion Bar and Grill, The Botanical Brasserie and Victoria Plaza Café.

In 2021, the new Family Kitchen & Shop opened near the Children's Garden, replacing the nearby tented White Peaks Family Restaurant.

Media
Films, documentaries and other media made about Kew Gardens include:
 A short colour film World Garden by cinematographer Geoffrey Unsworth in 1942
 A 2003 episode of the Channel 4 TV series Time Team, presented by Tony Robinson, that searched for the remains of George III's palace
 A 2004 episode of the BBC Four series Art of the Garden which looked at the building of the Great Palm House in the 1840s
  BBC website: A Year at Kew — a 2005 documentary of "behind the scenes" at Kew Gardens
 Three series of A Year at Kew (2007), filmed for BBC television and released on DVD
 Cruickshank on Kew: The Garden That Changed the World, a 2009 BBC documentary, presented by Dan Cruickshank, exploring the history of the relationship between Kew Gardens and the British Empire
 David Attenborough's 2012 Kingdom of Plants 3D
 2014 video game Sherlock Holmes: Crimes & Punishments featured an episode The Kew Gardens Drama which centers on a murder in the building.

In 1921 Virginia Woolf published her short story "Kew Gardens", which gives brief descriptions of four groups of people as they pass by a flowerbed.

Access and transport

Kew Gardens is accessible by four gates that are open to the public: the Elizabeth Gate, at the west end of Kew Green, and was originally called the Main Gate before being renamed in 2012 to commemorate the Diamond Jubilee of Elizabeth II; the Brentford Gate, which faces the River Thames; the Victoria Gate (named after Queen Victoria), situated in Kew Road, which is also the location of the Visitors' Centre; and the Lion Gate, also situated in Kew Road.

Other gates that are not open to the public include Unicorn Gate, Cumberland Gate and Jodrell Gate (all in Kew Road), Isleworth Gate (facing the Thames), and Oxenhouse Gate (south boundary with Old Deer Park).

Kew Gardens station, a London Underground and National Rail station opened in 1869 and served by both the District line and the London Overground services on the North London Line, is the nearest train station to the gardens – only  along Lichfield Road from the Victoria Gate entrance. Kew Bridge station, on the other side of the Thames, 800 metres from the Elizabeth Gate entrance via Kew Bridge, is served by South Western Railway from Clapham Junction and Waterloo.

London Buses route 65, between Ealing Broadway and Kingston, stops near the Lion Gate and Victoria Gate entrances; route 110, between Hammersmith and Hounslow, stops near Kew Gardens station; while routes 237 and 267 stop at Kew Bridge station.

London River Services operate from Westminster during the summer, stopping at Kew Pier,  from Elizabeth Gate. Cycle racks are located just inside the Victoria Gate, Elizabeth Gate and Brentford Gate entrances. There is a 300-space car park outside Brentford Gate, reached via Ferry Lane, as well as some free, though restricted, on-street parking on Kew Road.

See also

 List of World Heritage Sites in the United Kingdom
 Royal Botanic Gardens Kew, which manages Kew Gardens and Wakehurst Place
 Wakehurst Place
 Botanists active at Kew Gardens
 Joseph Dalton Hooker, who succeeded his father as director in 1865
 The Great Plant Hunt – a primary school science initiative created by Kew Gardens, commissioned and funded by the Wellcome Trust
 Index Kewensis, a massive index of plant names started and maintained by Kew Gardens
 Kew Bulletin, a quarterly peer-reviewed scientific journal on plant and fungal taxonomy published by Springer Science+Business Media on behalf of the Royal Botanic Gardens, Kew

References

External links

 Official website
  — The Royal Botanic Gardens of Kew originated in.....

1759 establishments in England
Art museums and galleries in London
Botanical gardens in London
Botanical research institutes
Buildings and structures on the River Thames
Gardens by Capability Brown
Gardens in London
Greenhouses in the United Kingdom
Grade I listed buildings in the London Borough of Richmond upon Thames
Grade I listed parks and gardens in London
Grade II listed buildings in the London Borough of Richmond upon Thames
Japanese gardens in England
Kew Green
Kew, London
Medical museums in London
Museums in the London Borough of Richmond upon Thames
Natural history museums in England
Parks and open spaces in the London Borough of Richmond upon Thames
 
World Heritage Sites in London